Cosmic background radiation is electromagnetic radiation that fills all space. The origin of this radiation depends on the region of the spectrum that is observed. One component is the cosmic microwave background. This component is redshifted photons that have freely streamed from an epoch when the Universe became transparent for the first time to radiation. Its discovery and detailed observations of its properties are considered one of the major confirmations of the Big Bang. The discovery (by chance in 1965) of the cosmic background radiation suggests that the early universe was dominated by a radiation field, a field of extremely high temperature and pressure.

The Sunyaev–Zel'dovich effect shows the phenomena of radiant cosmic background radiation interacting with "electron" clouds distorting the spectrum of the radiation.

There is also background radiation in the infrared, x-rays, etc., with different causes, and they can sometimes be resolved into an individual source. See cosmic infrared background and X-ray background. See also cosmic neutrino background and extragalactic background light.

Timeline of significant events

1896: 
Charles Édouard Guillaume estimates the "radiation of the stars" to be 5.6 K.

1926: 
Sir Arthur Eddington estimates the non-thermal radiation of starlight in the galaxy has an effective temperature of 3.2 K. 

1930s:
Erich Regener calculates that the non-thermal spectrum of cosmic rays in the galaxy has an effective temperature of 2.8 K.

1931:
The term microwave first appears in print: "When trials with wavelengths as low as 18 cm were made known, there was undisguised surprise that the problem of the micro-wave had been solved so soon." Telegraph & Telephone Journal XVII. 179/1"

1938:
Walther Nernst re-estimates the cosmic ray temperature as 0.75 K.

1946:
The term "microwave" is first used in print in an astronomical context in an article "Microwave Radiation from the Sun and Moon" by Robert Dicke and Robert Beringer.

1946:
Robert Dicke predicts a microwave background radiation temperature of 20 K (ref: Helge Kragh)

1946:
Robert Dicke predicts a microwave background radiation temperature of "less than 20 K" but later revised to 45 K (ref: Stephen G. Brush).

1946:
George Gamow estimates a temperature of 50 K.

1948:
Ralph Alpher and Robert Herman re-estimate Gamow's estimate at 5 K.

1949:
Ralph Alpher and Robert Herman re-re-estimate Gamow's estimate at 28 K.

1960s:
Robert Dicke re-estimates a MBR (microwave background radiation) temperature of 40 K (ref: Helge Kragh).

1965:
Arno Penzias and Robert Woodrow Wilson measure the temperature to be approximately 3 K. Robert Dicke, P. J. E. Peebles, P. G. Roll and D. T. Wilkinson interpret this radiation as a signature of the Big Bang.

See also

 Hot dark matter
 Irradiation
 Unruh effect

References

External links
The Diffuse X-ray and Gamma-ray Background & Deep Fields

 
Observational astronomy
Physical cosmology
Concepts in astronomy
Electromagnetic radiation